Mazzi is a surname of Italian origin. Notable people with the surname include:

 Alessandro Mazzi, Italian racing cyclist.
 Giampiero Mazzi, Italian rugby union player and a coach
 Marco Mazzi, Italian writer, filmmaker, art critic and photographer

Surnames of Italian origin